This is a list of films which have placed number one at the box office in Australia during 2015. All amounts are in Australian dollars.

Highest-grossing films

See also
List of Australian films - Australian films by year
2015 in film

References

Urban Cinefile - Box Office

2015
Australia
2015 in Australian cinema